Christopher James Holland (born 11 September 1975) is an English football coach, currently assistant manager of  club Clitheroe, and former professional player. He played as a midfielder in the Premier League for Newcastle United and made 279 appearances in the Football League playing for Preston North End, Birmingham City, Huddersfield Town and Boston United. He is a former England under-21 international. He later played non-league football for Boston United, Southport, Leigh Genesis, Fleetwood Town, Burscough and Guiseley, where he began his coaching career. He was briefly assistant manager of AFC Telford United, and joined Clitheroe in 2020.

Club career
Holland was born in Whalley, Lancashire, and started his football career as a trainee at Preston North End in 1993. He made just one league appearance as a substitute before signing for Premier League club Newcastle United on 20 January 1994 for a fee of £100,000. However, an eye injury sustained during an ammonia attack hindered his progress and he joined Birmingham City on loan on 3 September 1996. The loan was made permanent in October 1996 for a fee of £600,000. He helped Birmingham reach the Division One playoffs in 1999, however he missed a crucial penalty as they lost to Watford in a shoot out. He made 88 appearances in all competitions for Birmingham, of which 70 were in the league.

On 3 February 2000, Holland joined Huddersfield Town for a fee of £100,000. He scored the first goal of his professional career, a winner against Nottingham Forest, on 21 March. He played regularly for three seasons, but when told by manager Peter Jackson that a new contract would not be offered at the end of the 2003–04 season, he chose to join League Two club Boston United in March 2004.

After two years playing regularly, during which he made 85 league appearances, he moved nearer to his Lancashire home when he signed an 18-month contract with Conference National club Southport on 31 January 2007 on a free transfer. Despite Southport's relegation to the Conference North at the end of the season, Holland agreed a new contract and was appointed club captain. Holland was a vital part of the Southport side in the 2007–08 season. He scored his first goal for the club at Hyde United. His next goal came three weeks later in Southport's 3–1 victory at his old club Boston United.

In July 2008 Holland signed for Northern Premier League Premier Division club Leigh Genesis on a free transfer. He made his debut on the opening day of the 2008–09 season, in a 2–0 defeat to Eastwood Town. He scored his first goal in his tenth game for the club on 20 September in a 4–2 defeat to Whitby Town.

On 14 November 2008 he joined Conference North club Fleetwood Town, making his debut the next day in a 2–1 away victory over Stafford Rangers. In March 2009, Holland joined another Conference North outfit, Burscough.

He remained at Burscough until the end of the season, then joined Guiseley of the Northern Premier League. He helped that club win the title in his first season, but was appointed assistant manager in September 2010, and thereafter his competitive appearances were restricted to the substitutes' bench. After Guiseley sacked manager Steve Kittrick in September 2013, Holland stayed on briefly as assistant to caretaker Mark Bower, but a review of management structures meant he left two weeks later.

In May 2015, Holland joined up with Kittrick again as assistant manager of Conference North club AFC Telford United. Just five matches into the new season, with the team bottom of the table, Kittrick and Holland were dismissed.

In May 2020, Holland became assistant manager at Clitheroe of the Northern Premier League Division One North-West.

Outside football, Holland works in construction.

International career
Holland is a former England youth and under-21 international. He won the first of his ten under-21 caps while at Newcastle.

Career statistics

References

External links

1975 births
Living people
People from Whalley, Lancashire
English footballers
England under-21 international footballers
Association football midfielders
Preston North End F.C. players
Newcastle United F.C. players
Birmingham City F.C. players
Huddersfield Town A.F.C. players
Boston United F.C. players
Southport F.C. players
Leigh Genesis F.C. players
Fleetwood Town F.C. players
Burscough F.C. players
Guiseley A.F.C. players
English Football League players
Premier League players
National League (English football) players
Northern Premier League players
Association football coaches